Vera Ducas (1912 – 29 March 1948) was born to a Jewish family in Austria-Hungary/Czechoslovakia. She fled the 1939 Nazi invasion with her husband and child. They lived in Turkey for several years before arriving in Palestine. She didn't speak Hebrew and was unable to find work and is alleged to have become an informer for the British CID.

She was kidnapped from one of the main cafes of Jerusalem's Jewish Quarter and her body found on a patch of waste ground, shot through the head. It was reported that the Stern Gang had announced that they had killed her, accusing her of spying for the British.

See also
 Meir Tobianski
 Moshe Kelman

References

Jews in Mandatory Palestine
People from Jerusalem
People of the 1948 Arab–Israeli War
1912 births
1948 deaths
Women in warfare post-1945
Women in war in the Middle East